Tejvan Pettinger (born Richard Pettinger, 11 November 1976 in London, United Kingdom) is a British cyclist successful in UK hill-climbs and time trials. He works as an economics teacher and lives in Oxford.

Biography 
Pettinger was born in Runnymede, Surrey, but spent most of his time growing up in Menston, West Yorkshire. When he was young he did some cycling and cross-country running. He started cycling aged 14, riding for Otley CC. He went to Bradford Grammar School and then Lady Margaret Hall, Oxford where he read PPE.

Pettinger has been a student of the spiritual master Sri Chinmoy since 1999. He adopted the name Tejvan from Sri Chinmoy (a Sanskrit word representing dynamism, enthusiasm and self-giving).

Pettinger was a member of the Oxford University CC during the late 1990s. After an illness he started running, but then injured his knee. In 2003, he resumed cycling, starting racing in 2004.

Races and Results 
 2013 British National Hill Climb Championships, 1st 
 2014 UK national 100 mile time trial championship, 3rd

Bibliography 
 Pettinger: Happiness Will Follow You (2011), 
 Pettinger: Cracking Economics Octopus Press (2016), 
 Pettinger: What Would Keynes Do? Octopus Press (2017), 
 Pettinger: Economics Without the Boring Bits (2021),

References

External links 

 tejvan.co.uk
 Video : British Time Trial Championship, 2015

1976 births
Living people
English male cyclists
Devotees of Sri Chinmoy
People from Oxford